Ejigayehu Shibabaw, known by her stage name Gigi (born 1974), is an Ethiopian singer. She has performed the music of Ethiopia in combination with a wide variety of other genres, often in collaboration with her husband Bill Laswell, a bassist and producer.

Early life and career
Gigi was born and raised in Chagni in northwestern Ethiopia.  She has described learning traditional songs from an Ethiopian Orthodox priest in the family home.  She lived in Kenya for a few years before moving to San Francisco in about 1998.

Gigi recorded two albums for the expatriate Ethiopian community, but it was her 2001 album, titled simply Gigi, that brought her widespread attention.  She had been noticed by Palm Pictures owner Chris Blackwell, who had years earlier introduced reggae to the mainstream through his former label, Island Records. Blackwell and Gigi's producer (and later, husband) Bill Laswell, decided to use American jazz musicians (including Herbie Hancock, Wayne Shorter, Pharoah Sanders, and others) to accompany Gigi on the album.

The result was a fusion of contemporary and traditional sounds. The album was a critical success internationally and generated controversy in her home country for such a radical break with Ethiopian popular music. This release was soon followed by Illuminated Audio,  an ambient dub style remix of the album by Laswell.

2003 saw the release of Zion Roots, under the band name Abyssinia Infinite. Bill Laswell played guitar and keyboard (instead of his usual bass), and several of Gigi's family members contributed vocals. The album was a return to a mainly acoustic sound for Gigi, incorporating instruments such as the krar and the tabla. The track "Gole" is in Agaw, the language of Gigi's father's village.

Gigi's voice can be heard in the Hollywood film Beyond Borders (2003), in which Angelina Jolie portrays an aid worker during the 1984 - 1985 famine in Ethiopia.

She released her Three album, Gold and Wax on Palm Pictures, in 2006.

She has also appeared in "Running From the Light" in Buckethead's Enter the Chicken (2005). In 2010, she recorded Mesgana Ethiopia with Material, released on the M.O.D. Technologies label.

Her 2001 song "Guramayle" appears in the 2006 documentary God Grew Tired of Us. It plays over opening and closing credits.

Personal life 
Gigi is married to her producer Bill Laswell. Her younger sister, singer Tigist Shibabaw, died under unknown circumstances in 2008.

Discography

As leader
 Tsehay, 1997
 One Ethiopia, 1998
 Gigi (Guramayle), 2001
 Illuminated Audio, 2003 
 Abyssinia Infinite: Zion Roots, 2003
 Gold & Wax, 2006
 Mesgana Ethiopia, 2010

Other appearances 
 Future2Future by Herbie Hancock
 Sacred System: Dub Chamber 4 (Book of Exit) by Bill Laswell
 Realize by Karsh Kale
 Live at Stern Grove by Tabla Beat Science
 Enter The Chicken by Buckethead
 Radioaxiom by Bill Laswell and Jah Wobble
 Daylightless by Fanu (in Salem and Semena-Worck tracks)
 Shin.e - Lightyears by Shin Terai and Buckethead

Notes

References

External links 

 Gigi Music Page on MySpace.com
 Gigi Profile Page on MySpace.com
 
 Fly: Review of Gold & Wax
 Afropop Worldwide (PRI program):
 Afropop interview with Gigi
 Afropop review of Gigi
 Afropop review of Zion Roots

Living people
21st-century Ethiopian women singers
Ethiopian emigrants to the United States
1974 births